Moondla (also Mundla) is a village situated in the taluka of Jamwa Ramgarh, in Jaipur district, in the state of Rajasthan, India.

Demographics
Its total population is 1156 including 160 children below the age of 6 years. The percentage of child population is 13.84%. There are 180 houses in the village.

References

External links

Villages in Jaipur district